The Islamic Republic of Iran Army, acronymed AJA, simply known as the Iranian Army or Artesh, is the "conventional military of Iran" and part of Armed Forces of the Islamic Republic of Iran. It is tasked to protect the territorial integrity of the country from external and internal threats and to project power.

Artesh has its own Joint Staff which coordinates its four separate service branches: Ground Forces, Air Force, Navy and the newly established Air Defense Force.

History

Classical antiquity

Early modern

Missions and deployments 

The Iranian army has fought against two major invasions in contemporary times. The 1941 invasion by the Allies of World War II resulted in a decisive loss for the Iranian forces, the deposition of Iran's Shah and five years of subsequent occupation, while the 1980 Iraqi invasion began the Iran–Iraq War, which lasted almost eight years and ended in status quo ante bellum. The army has also been actively engaged in quelling tribal and separatist rebellions beginning in the 1940s in order to protect Iran's territorial integrity.

Extraterritorial operations 
From 1972 to 1976, Iranian troops were sent to Oman to fight with the Royal Army of Oman against the Dhofar Rebellion. In 1976, a contingent was sent to Pakistan to assist the Pakistan Army against the Insurgency in Balochistan. Iranian personnel were also reportedly present in the Vietnam War. In 2016, members of the special forces of Iran were deployed to fight in the Syrian Civil War.

International peacekeeping missions 

The Iranian Army participated in UN peacekeeping missions in the 1970s, sending a battalion to replace Peruvian forces in the Golan Heights as part of the Disengagement Observer Force. After the Israeli invasion of Lebanon, the bulk of the forces were part of the Interim Force in Lebanon until late 1978. Replaced by Finnish forces, Iranian peacekeepers were withdrawn in 1979 following the Islamic revolution.

In 1993, the Iranian Army reestablished its professional peacekeeping units and declared that they are ready to be dispatched at the UN's directive. Since then, Iran has deployed forces in Ethiopia and Eritrea in 2003 and the African Union Mission in Darfur in 2012.

The Iranian Army's maritime branch has launched several missions to fight piracy off the coast of Somalia, securing the release of many other countries' sailors.

Aid missions 
The Iranian Army has deployed forces to help the Red Lion and Sun and Red Crescent societies in rescue and relief missions after domestic natural disasters, including clearing roads, reestablishing communications, supplying goods, airlifting equipment, transporting casualties and personnel and setting up field hospitals and post-hospital care centres.

Anniversary

Equipment

Commanders

Military academies

Symbols and uniforms

See also
 Islamic Revolutionary Guard Corps
 Rank insignia of the Iranian military

References

External links

 Official site of the Islamic Republic of Iran Army 

 
Military of Iran